The 2022–23 season is the 129th season in the existence of FC Porto and the club's 89th consecutive season in the top flight of Portuguese football. In addition to the domestic league, they are participating in this season's editions of the Taça de Portugal, Taça da Liga, Supertaça Cândido de Oliveira and UEFA Champions League.

Players

Current squad

Transfers

In

Out

Loan return

Technical staff

References

FC Porto seasons
Porto
Porto